The 1967 Cleveland Browns season was the team's 18th season with the National Football League.
The Browns were back in the playoffs after a one-year absence. They finished 9–5, the same as in 1966, but this time, it was good enough for them to get in as they won the Century Division championship in the first year of play after the NFL split the Eastern and Western conferences into two divisions each. The division race was not close, as the Browns finished two games ahead of the runner-up New York Giants (7–7), their old arch rival in the 1950s and early 1960s.

Running Back Leroy Kelly went over 1,000 yards rushing for the second straight time, getting 1,205 to go along with 11 touchdowns, while Ernie Green, now out of the shadow of Jim Brown, went over 700 yards for the second year in a row, getting 710. Quarterback Frank Ryan, the architect of the 27–0 1964 NFL title game victory over the Baltimore Colts, was in his last full season as a starter. He had 20 TD passes and 16 interceptions. But Ryan, with his body, especially his shoulder, beat up, gave way to Bill Nelsen early the next year.

The 52–14 playoff loss to Dallas in the Eastern Conference title contest caused Browns head coach Blanton Collier to re-shape his team at other positions as well, as new players were brought in to replace some of the fading stars who had carried the club for years. For instance, this was the last season for Hall of Fame place-kicker Lou Groza, who retired for the second time – this time for good – after making 11 of 23 field-goal tries. Groza, the last member of the original Browns from the team's inception in 1946, would retire after 21 seasons. Groza was replaced the next season by Don Cockroft.

Offseason

NFL Draft 
The following were selected in the 1967 NFL Draft.

Exhibition schedule 

There was a doubleheader on September 2, 1967 Falcons vs Vikings and Packers vs Browns.

Regular season

Schedule

Game summaries

Week 13 
The Browns clinch their first Century Division title with a 20-16 victory at St. Louis. One touchdown comes on an 18-yard interception return by linebacker Jim Houston and the game ends when St. Louis tight end Jackie Smith catches a 41-yard pass and is dragged down at the Cleveland 18 yard line.

Week 14

Playoffs

Standings

Personnel

Roster

Staff/Coaches

References

External links 
 1967 Cleveland Browns at Pro Football Reference
 1967 Cleveland Browns Statistics at jt-sw.com
 1967 Cleveland Browns Schedule at jt-sw.com
 1967 Cleveland Browns at DatabaseFootball.com  
 Season summary and results at Cleveland Browns.com

Cleveland
Cleveland Browns seasons
Cleveland Browns